Sohrāb or Suhrāb is a legendary warrior from the Shahnameh, or the Tales of Kings by Ferdowsi in the tragedy of Rostam and Sohrab. He was the son of Rostam, who was an Iranian warrior, and Tahmineh, the daughter of the king of Kingdom of Samangan, a neighboring country. He was slain at a young age by his father Rostam. Rostam only found out he was his son after fatally wounding him in a duel. Kaykavous, the king of Iran, delayed giving Rostam the panacea (Noush Daru) to save Sohrab as he feared losing his power to the alliance of the father and the son.
Rostam gave Tahmineh a bracelet as a reminder and a sign to his son.

His name means “hot red water”, and is analogous with the modern Persian term, "Sorkh-ab". It can also mean "beautiful and illustrious/shining face". The name Sohrab is associated with tremendous bravery and courage.

Family tree

See also 
 
 
 Zurab – Georgian masculine given name

References

External links 

Kayanians
Persian mythology